Nur al-Din Ali ibn Abd Allah ibn Ahmad al-Hasani al-Samhudi was a Mamluk Shafi'i Islamic scholar. 
He is known to be the last person to enter and clean the Inner Chamber of the prophet Muhammad's grave.
Al Samhudi wrote Wafa al-Wafa bi akhbar Dar al-Mustafa in five volumes. In this book he intended to gather in it everything connected to the city of Medina.

References

External links
Ghadir Khumm: Narrations where the Prophet [s] confirms from the Companions his authority over them

Asharis
Shafi'is
Sunni Muslim scholars of Islam
1466 births
16th-century Muslim scholars of Islam
15th-century jurists
16th-century jurists
1533 deaths